Adédàpọ̀ is a name and surname of Yoruba origin, meaning "the crown or royalty mixes together alike." 

Notable people with the name include:
Naima Adedapo (born October 5, 1984), American singer and dancer
Adedapo Tejuoso (born 1938), Nigerian monarch

Yoruba given names
Yoruba-language surnames